George Sanders Barker (26 September 1885 – 15 April 1947) was an Australian rules footballer who played with Essendon in the Victorian Football League (VFL).

Barker, who was from Abbotsford, was Essendon's leading goal-kicker in 1905, with 29 goals. His tally that year included a seven goal haul in a win over Collingwood at Victoria Park. The following year he played in the Victorian Football Association (VFA) with Richmond, before returning to Essendon in 1907. He played for Northcote between 1910 and 1912.

References

External links
 
 

1885 births
Australian rules footballers from Melbourne
Essendon Football Club players
Richmond Football Club (VFA) players
Northcote Football Club players
Australian military personnel of World War I
1947 deaths
People from Collingwood, Victoria
Military personnel from Melbourne